Nahal Ayun (lit. Ayun Stream), sometimes spelled Nahal Iyyon, in  Bureighit, or in full Nahr Bareighit, is a perennial stream and a tributary of the Jordan River. The stream originates from two springs in the Marjayoun (Merj 'Ayun) valley in southern Lebanon, runs southward for seven kilometers through various irrigation ditches, then flows into Israel near Metulla, where it continues through the Hula Valley in the Galilee Panhandle until emptying in the Hasbani River just before it reaches the Jordan River.

Names

Arabic
The Arabic name is most often transliterated as "Dardara" for the upper course and "Bareighit" or "Bureighith" for the lower one. The "Memoirs of the Survey of Western Palestine", published in 1881 in connection with the maps resulting from the 1870s Survey, use a slightly different spelling; the "very large spring" of a  'Ain ed Derdarah, lit. "the spring of the derdârah (elm) tree", from the village of El Khiam, is mentioned to create a "strong stream", that once it's enhanced by the waters of  'Ain Hosh (Hosh Spring) becomes Nahr Bareighit, lit. "the river of fleas". However, the Survey map actually uses another name altogether for the upper course, Wadi el Kharrar, "the valley of the murmuring water". This seems to be either a typo, or a lesser-used name, since the index list of the Memoirs is sending under "Wadi el Kharrar", to page 36, where the name Wadi el Kharrar doesn't appear at all; instead, on that page there is an explanation regarding names omitted from the map due to lack of space - but this doesn't apply either, since the name "Wadi Kharrar" appears very well visible on Sheet 2 / Qb across the Merj 'Ayun plain.

Nature reserve

During the rainy winter months the water-flow is strongest. During the summer months, water is diverted for crop irrigation close to the stream's springs. Differences in elevation form waterfalls along the stream. These falls were declared a nature reserve, and include:
 Tahana ("flourmill") waterfall, 21 m high
 Eshed ("cascades") waterfall, with two steps, 9.5 m the upper fall and 5 m the bottom fall (eshed as a Hebrew root means "to pour", which gave rise to the meaning of "waterfall"; also "bottom, slope, foundation, lower part".
 Ayun/Iyyon waterfall, 9.2 m high
 Tan(n)ur waterfall, 30 m high, named either after the tannur oven, or after the Lebanese tanur skirt

Flora and fauna
Tree types in the reserve include terebinths (Pistacia terebinthus), buckthorns (Rhamnus palaestinus), and maples (Acer obtusifolium). Other growth includes Spanish broom, rubus, cyclamen (Cyclamen persicum), and anemones.

Grey wagtails can be found during the winter months, as well as white-throated kingfishers and common kestrels.

See also
Wildlife in Israel
Tourism in Israel

References

Rivers of Israel
Nature reserves in Israel
Tributaries of the Jordan River
Rivers of Lebanon